Stenotabanus is a genus of horse flies in the family Tabanidae. There are at least 100 described species in Stenotabanus.

See also
 List of Stenotabanus species

References

Tabanidae
Brachycera genera
Taxa named by Adolfo Lutz
Diptera of North America
Diptera of South America